Michael Allendorf (born 16 September 1986) is a German handball player for MT Melsungen and the German national team.

References

1986 births
Living people
German male handball players
HSG Wetzlar players